Hunan cuisine, also known as Xiang cuisine, consists of the cuisines of the Xiang River region, Dongting Lake and western Hunan Province in China. It is one of the Eight Great Traditions of Chinese cuisine and is well known for its hot and spicy flavours, fresh aroma and deep colours. Common cooking techniques include stewing, frying, pot-roasting, braising and smoking. Due to the high agricultural output of the region, ingredients for Hunan dishes are many and varied.

History
The history of the cooking skills employed in Hunan cuisine dates back to the 17th century. The first mention of chili peppers in local gazettes in the province date to 1684, 21st year of the Kangxi Emperor. During the course of its history, Hunan cuisine assimilated a variety of local forms, eventually evolving into its own style. Some well-known dishes include fried chicken with Sichuan spicy sauce and smoked pork with dried long green beans.

Hunan cuisine consists of three primary styles:
 Xiang River style: Originating from Changsha, Xiangtan and Hengyang
 Dongting Lake style: Originating from Yueyang, Yiyang and Changde
 Western Hunan style: Originating from Zhangjiajie, Jishou and Huaihua

Features 

With its liberal use of chili peppers, shallots and garlic, Hunan cuisine is known for being gan la or purely hot, as opposed to Sichuan cuisine, to which it is often compared. Sichuan cuisine uses its distinctive ma la seasoning and other complex flavour combinations, frequently employs Sichuan pepper along with chilies which are often dried. It also utilises more dried or preserved ingredients and condiments. Hunan cuisine, on the other hand, is often spicier by pure chili content and contains a larger variety of fresh ingredients. Both Hunan and Sichuan cuisine are perhaps significantly oilier than the other cuisines in China, but Sichuan dishes are generally oilier than Hunan dishes. Another characteristic distinguishing Hunan cuisine from Sichuan cuisine is that Hunan cuisine uses smoked and cured goods in its dishes much more frequently.
 
Hunan cuisine's menu changes with the seasons. In a hot and humid summer, a meal will usually start with cold dishes or a platter holding a selection of cold meats with chilies for opening the pores and keeping cool in the summer. In winter, a popular choice is the hot pot, thought to heat the blood in the cold months. A special hot pot called yuanyang huoguo is notable for splitting the pot into two sides – a spicy one and a mild one. One of the classic dishes in Hunan cuisine served in restaurants and at home is farmer pepper fried pork. It is made with several common ingredients: pork belly, green pepper, fermented black beans and other spices.

List of notable dishes 

A discussion of Hunan cuisine overall may list a number of piquant dishes, usually but not always very hot and spicy.

See also
 Chinese cuisine
 Sichuan cuisine
 List of Chinese dishes

References

 
 
Regional cuisines of China